The 2012 Heineken Open was a men's tennis tournament played on outdoor hard courts. It was the 37th edition of the Heineken Open, and was part of the ATP World Tour 250 series of the 2012 ATP World Tour. It took place at the ASB Tennis Centre in Auckland, New Zealand, from 9 January to 14 January 2012. First-seeded David Ferrer won the singles title.

Finals

Singles

 David Ferrer defeated  Olivier Rochus, 6–3, 6–4
It was Ferrer's 1st title of the year and 12th of his career. It was his 3rd win at Auckland, also winning in 2007 and 2011.

Doubles

 Oliver Marach /  Alexander Peya defeated  František Čermák /  Filip Polášek, 6–3, 6–2

Singles main-draw entrants

Seeds 

 Rankings as of December 26, 2011

Other entrants
The following players received wildcards into the singles main draw:
  Ryan Harrison 
  Sam Querrey
  Michael Venus

The following players received entry into the singles main draw through qualifying:
  Stéphane Bohli
  Tobias Kamke
  Adrian Mannarino
  Benoît Paire

Retirements
  Filippo Volandri (finger injury)

See also
 2014 ASB Classic – women's tournament

References

External links
Official website

 
Heineken Open
Heineken Open
ATP Auckland Open
January 2012 sports events in New Zealand